The University of Cape Coast is a public collegiate university located in the historic town of Cape Coast. The campus has a rare seafront and sits on a hill overlooking the wide Atlantic Ocean. It operates on two campuses: the Southern Campus (Old Site) and the Northern Campus (New Site). Two of the most important historical sites in Ghana, Elmina and Cape Coast Castle, are a few kilometres away from its campus.

The University of Cape Coast was established in October 1962 as a university college in response to the country's dire need for highly qualified and skilled manpower in the education sector. Its original mandate was therefore to train graduate teachers for second cycle institutions, teacher training colleges and technical institutions, a mission that the two existing public universities at the time were unequipped to fulfil. 
 
On 1 October 1971, the college attained the status of a full and independent university, with the authority to confer its own degrees, diplomas and certificates by an Act of Parliament. Today, with the expansion of some of its faculties/schools and the diversification of programmes, the university has the capacity to meet the manpower needs of other ministries and industries in the country, besides that of the Ministry of Education.
The university has since added to its functions the training of doctors and health care professionals, business professionals, administrators, legal professionals, and agriculturalists. UCC graduates include Ministers of State, High Commissioners, CEOs, and Members of Parliament.

History
The University of Cape Coast was established in October, 1962 as a university college and placed in a special relationship with the University of Ghana, Legon. 
On 1 October 1971, the college attained the status of a full and independent University, with the authority to confer its own degrees, diplomas and certificates by an Act of Parliament.
The university was established out of a dire need for highly qualified and skilled manpower in education. Its original mandate was therefore to train graduate professional teachers for Ghana's second cycle institutions and the Ministry of Education in order to meet the manpower needs of the country's accelerated education programme at the time. 
Today, with the expansion of some of its Faculties/Schools and the diversification of programmes, the university has the capacity to meet the manpower needs of other ministries and industries in the country, besides that of the Ministry of Education.
From an initial student enrolment of 155 in 1963, the University of Cape Coast now has a total student population of about 80,000.
The university started with two departments, namely: Arts and Science. These departments developed into Faculties in 1963. In order to achieve the set objectives, in 1964, the university created two more Faculties, namely: Education and Economics & Social Studies [now Faculty of Social Sciences].
The fifth faculty [School of Agriculture] was established in 1975. 
The Faculty of Science was split into the Schools of Physical and Biological Sciences during the 2002/2003 academic year while the Department of Business Studies was also elevated to the School of Business with effect from the 2003/2004 academic year.
The Medical School, faculty of Law and school of economics amongst others have been added.
The university now trains doctors and health care professionals, as well as education planners, administrators, agriculturalists, Accountants, lawyers etc. 
The University of Cape Coast (UCC) graduates include Ministers of State, High Commissioners, CEOs, and Members of Parliament.

Student population
From an initial student enrolment of 155 in 1963, the University of Cape Coast now has a total student population of 74,720. The breakdown is as follows: 18,949 regular undergraduate students, 1445 sandwich undergraduate students, 1014 regular postgraduate students, 2773 sandwich postgraduate students 48,989 distance undergraduate students and 1540 postgraduate distance students. The university admitted a total of 24,723 students into its various programmes for the 2016/2017 academic year.

Academics
The University of Cape Coast is today organized into six colleges. Each college has different faculties, schools and departments under them as elaborated below;

College of Agriculture & Natural Sciences [CANS]

School of Physical Sciences 
 Department of Physics
 Department of Mathematics
 Department of Statistics
 Department of Laboratory Technology
 Department of Computer Science & Information Technology
 Department of Chemistry
 Laser & Fibre Optics Centre
 Industrial Chemistry Programme

School of Biological Sciences 
 Department of Molecular Biology and Biotechnology
 Department of Fisheries & Aquatic Sciences
 Department of Environmental Sciences
 Department of Entomology & Wildlife
 Department of Biomedical & Forensic Sciences
 Department of Biochemistry

School of Agriculture 
 Department of Soil Science
 Department of Crop Science
 Department of Animal Science
 Department of Agricultural Engineering
 Department of Agricultural Economics and Extension
 Technology Village
 Supervise Enterprise Projects (SEPs)
 Meat Processing Unit (MPU)

College of Distance Education [CoDE] 
 Department of Business studies
 Department of Education
 Department of Mathematics and Science

College of Education Studies [CES]

Faculty of Educational Foundations 
 Centre for Child Development Research and Referral
 Counselling Centre
 Department of Basic Education
 Department of Education & Psychology
 Department of Guidance and Counseling

Faculty of Humanities & Social Sciences Education 
 Department of Arts Education
 Department of Business and Social Sciences Education

Faculty of Science & Technology Education 
 Department of Health Science Education
 Department of Health, Physical Education & Recreation
 Department of Mathematics & ICT Education
 Department of Science Education
 Department of Vocational & Technical Education

School of Educational Development & Outreach 
 Centre for Educational Research, Evaluation and Development
 Centre for Teacher Professional Development
 Centre for Teaching Support
 Institute of Education

College of Humanities and Legal Studies [CHLS]

Faculty of Social Sciences 
 Institute for Oil and Gas Studies
 Institute for Development Studies (IDS)
 Department of Sociology & Anthropology
 Department of Population & Health
 Department of Hospitality & Tourism Management
 Department of Geography & Regional Planning
 Department of Economics
 Centre for Gender, Research, Advocacy and Documentation (CEGRAD)
 Micro-finance Unit
 Centre for Data Archiving, Management, Analysis and Advocacy (C-DAMAA)

Faculty of Arts 
 Information & Literacy Skills
 Department of Theatre & Film Studies
 Department of Religion and Human Values
 Department of Music & Dance
 Department of History
 Department of Ghanaian Languages & Linguistics
 Department of French
 Department of English
 Department of Communication Studies
 Department of Classics & Philosophy
 Centre for African and International Studies

Faculty of Law 
 Department of Law
 Law Clinic & Department for Legal Extension
 Centre for Legal Research
 Law Library & Information Centre

School of Business 
 Department of Management
 Department of Accounting 
Department of Finance

Department of Marketing & Supply Chain Management

Department of Human Resource Management
 Professional & Management Development Unit (PMDU)
 Centre for Entrepreneurship and Small Enterprise Development (CESED)

College of Health & Allied Sciences [CoHAS]

School of Medical Sciences 
 Department of Nurse Anaesthesia
 Department of Anaesthesia & Pain Management
 Department of Anatomy & Cell Biology
 Department of Medical Biochemistry & Molecular Biology
 Department of Obstetrics & Gynaecology & Fetal Medicine
 Department of Internal Medicine & Therapeutics
 Department of Chemical Pathology
  Department of Community Medicine
  Department of Internal Medicine & Therapeutics
  Department of Medical Education & Information Technology
  Department of Microbiology & Immunology
  Department of Pharmacology
  Department of Paediatrics
  Department of Morbid Anatomy & Histopathology
  Department of Surgery
  Department of Psychological Medicine & Mental Health
  Department of Physiology

School of Nursing & Midwifery 
 Department of Nursing

School of Allied Health Sciences                   
  Department of Sports Science
  Department of Physician Assistant Studies
  Department of Nutrition and Dietetics
  Department of Medical Laboratory Technology
  Department of Medical Imaging
  Department of Health Information Management
  Department of Optometry

School of Graduate Studies and Research 
The School of Graduate Studies (SGS) of the University of Cape Coast came into being on 1 August 2008. It began as a Committee on Higher Degrees, with a mandate to advise Senate on the university's graduate policy and recommend the award of scholarship for approval. In 1992, the Committee on Higher Degrees was transformed to a Board of Graduate Studies.  This Board, a sub-committee of Academic Board was entrusted with responsibility for administering graduate education in the university, until its status was elevated to a school on 1 August 2008. The school has the mandate to co-ordinate graduate-level academic programmes for all colleges within the university. It also regulates and offers advice on graduate programmes of university colleges affiliated to the University of Cape Coast.

To achieve its vision and mission, the school has four-fold functions:
 Draft regulations for all higher degrees with a view to ensuring that acceptable academic standards are maintained.
 Receive reports and consider recommendations pertaining to higher degrees and graduate diplomas from Departmental and Faculty Committee of Graduate Studies.
 Determine the results of higher degrees and graduate diplomas.
 Make recommendations to the Academic Board for the award of higher degrees and graduate diplomas.
The university operates a two-semester system for its regular graduate programmes. The First Semester begins from August to December and Second Semester from January to May. The university awards Master of Arts (M.A.), Master of Science (MSc), Master of Education (MEd), Master of Business Administration (M.B.A.), Master of Philosophy (M.Phil.), Master of Commerce (M.Com.) and Doctor of Philosophy (PhD) degrees in the various disciplines.

M.A./MEd/MSc programmes will normally consist of two semesters of course work (nine months) followed by a project or dissertation (three months).

The Master of Philosophy (M.Phil.) programme will normally consist of two parts. Part I shall consist of two semesters of course work for full-time students and four semesters of course work for part-time students. Part II extends over 12-months and is for research and presentation of the thesis.
The Doctor of Philosophy (PhD) programme is essentially by research. The duration is between 3 and 4 years for full-time students and 4 and 5 years for part-time students.

Centre for International Education
The Centre for International Education (CIE), University of Cape Coast, was established to promote, support and coordinate all facets of international education activities in the university. These activities include international students and staff exchanges, research collaborations and publications, and information sharing, all aimed at enhancing the international image of the university.Centre for International Education | Centre for International Education

Over the years, the centre had fostered links with institutions of higher learning from the US, China, UK, Sweden, Germany, Liberia, Nigeria and Senegal, among others.

The centre offers specialized support services for inbound and outbound exchange students and staff on issues including, but not exclusive to, orientation, admission, enrollment, accommodation, pastoral care, pre-departure briefings and post-return debriefings for inbound and outbound exchange students and staff.

FUNCTIONS
The centre:
 Manages all matters and programmes relating to international education.
 Serves as an advisory unit to all academic departments on exchanges and collaborations.
 Serves as a service provider on campus to all international and visiting students, faculty members and staff.
 Is responsible for the development of Memorandum of Understanding or partnership agreements with institutions in and outside Ghana.
 Facilitates the exchange of staff, faculty and students of partner institutions and vice versa.
 Organizes international workshops, seminars and conferences.
The University of Cape Coast runs an international student exchange programme with participants from Europe, North America, and other African countries. International students are fully integrated into student and campus life and receive full credit on successful completion of their studies at UCC.

Affiliated Institutions
All Colleges of Education in Ghana
Pentecost University College
Christian Service University College
Palm Institute
Synergies Institute-Ghana
Fountainhead Christian College
Institute for Development and Technology Management
Institute for Security, Disaster and Emergency Studies (ISDES)
Klintaps University College
Nana Afia Kobi Serwaa Ampem II Nursing Training College
Nduom School of Business and Technology
College of Health and Well-Being
College of Health, Yamfo

Halls of Residence
Oguaa Hall 
Atlantic Hall 
Adehye Hall 
Casely Hayford Hall(Casford)
Kwame Nkrumah Hall 
Valco Hall
SRC Hall
Supernuation hall
Alumni Hall
Valco Trust Hall
PSI Hall

Ranking 
In September 2021, the University of Cape Coast was ranked by Times Higher Education 2022 World University Rankings as follows:
The No. 1 University in Africa for research influence (Globally)
The No. 1 University in Ghana
The No. 1 University in West Africa
Ranked amongst the top 5 Universities in Africa.
In October 2022, the university was again ranked the best in Ghana and West Africa. The 4th best in Africa and 24th in the world universities.

Notable alumni

 Edmund Abaka, photographer and professor of African history at the University of Miami
Rosina Acheampong, Ghanaian educationist and former headmistress of Wesley Girls High School 
 Alfred P. Addaquay, Ghanaian classical keyboardist, composer, arranger, conductor, choral director and singer
 Emmanuel Addow-Obeng, Ghanaian academic, administrator and cleric. He was the Vice-Chancellor of the University of Cape Coast and served as the Pro-Vice-Chancellor of the Central University of Ghana
 Mercy Catherine Adjabeng, author, magazine editor-in-chief and managing editor
 Jane Naana Opoku Agyemang, former Minister of Education of the Republic of Ghana, first female Vice Chancellor of a public university in Ghana, first female vice presidential candidate for the National Democratic Congress, the largest opposition political party in Ghana
 Kofi Akpabli, Ghanaian journalist, writer, and publisher 
 Kwesi Ahwoi, Ghana's High Commissioner to South Africa and Ghana's former Minister of Interior 
 Aba Andam, Ghanaian particle physicist
 Samuel Kobina Annim, government statistician and former associate professor of economics
 Dr. Yaw Ansong Jnr, physician-scientist, inventor, and entrepreneur
 Juliet Asante, award-winning filmmaker, entrepreneur, activist, Huffington Post blogger, Aspen Global Leadership fellow, Legatum Institute fellow, alumnus of the Fortune 500/State Department Mentorship program, and Vital Voices Global leaders forum
 Kojo Armah – Ghanaian lawyer, diplomat, and former member of parliament 
 George Aryee, for director general of the Ghana Broadcasting Corporation 
 Kweku Asiamah – Minister of Transport
 Barbara Asher Ayisi – Ghanaian politician, educationist, and Deputy Minister of Education
 Michael Okyere Baafi, a Ghanaian politician and executive secretary of Ghana Free Zones Board
 Emmanuel Kwasi Bandua – Ghanaian lawyer, politician, and member of parliament
 Ama Afo Blay, former director-general of the Ghana Education Service 
 Johnson Nyarko Boampong, Ghanaian pharmacist, biomedical scientist, and current vice chancellor of the University of Cape Coast
 Rosemond Aboagyewa Boohene, Ghanaian accountant, entrepreneurship scholar, and current pro vice chancellor of the University of Cape Coast
 Richard Damoah, Ghanaian physicist and research scientist at NASA's Goddard Space Flight Center
 Doris Dartey, former Ghanaian communication educator, consultant, and onetime member and chairperson of GJA Awards Committee
 Nana Amba Eyiaba I – Ghanaian traditional ruler (Queen-mother), educationist and former member of the Electoral Commission of Ghana 
 Dora Francisca Edu-Buandoh, current pro vice-chancellor and professor of English at the University of Cape Coast
 Millison Narh – Deputy Governor of the Bank of Ghana
 Abdul-Rashid Pelpuo - Member of Parliament and Minister of State for Private Public Partnership
 Yvonne Nduom, a Ghanaian public figure known chiefly as the wife of the leader of the Progressive People's Party and is currently the Executive Chairperson of Coconut Grove Hotels
 Kojo Oppong Nkrumah, a Ghanaian politician, lawyer, member of parliament and the Minister of Information in the administration of Nana Akufo-Addo
 Eric Oduro Osae, a Ghanaian local governance expert, lawyer and chartered accountant who serves as the Director General of the Internal Audit Agency of Ghana.
 William Quaitoo, a Ghanaian politician, and former Deputy Minister of Agriculture
 Kwabena Sarpong-Anane, acting Director General of the Ghana Broadcasting Corporation (2010–2011)
 Seth Terkper – Former Minister of Finance, MOFEP (2012– to 2016)
 Joseph Whittal – a Ghanaian who has been the Commissioner of Human Rights and Administrative Justice of Ghana since December 2016
 Daniel A. Wubah, President, Millersville University of Pennsylvania, USA
 Malik Al-Hassan Yakubu, a former Speaker of Parliament, a former Minister of Interior and a former member of parliament

Gallery

See also
 List of universities in Ghana
 Sam E. Jonah, Chancellor of the university
 Prof. Johnson Nyarko Boampong, Vice-Chancellor of the university

References

External links
 University of Cape Coast website
 University of Cape Coast Library
 Centre for International Education
 Affiliated Institutions 
 University of Cape Coast Staff Directory

University of Cape Coast
University of Cape Coast
Educational institutions established in 1962
1962 establishments in Ghana